The founder of Stop1984 started the project in 2001 as NGO which is documented in the
community of Heise.de (German link).
The project was discontinued in early 2008.
Computer scientists disbelieve in lawfulness of  the German decree of telecommunication control (German link)

Objectives of Stop1984 

Stop1984 mostly tries to alert people  with its website on:

 the value of the own privacy
 the value of the own data
 the risks of data abuse
 the consequences of the loss of privacy
 the political, social and individual consequences of increasing surveillance
 the dangers of political disinterest

The political objectives are:

 publishing formerly unpublished numbers regarding the success oder failure of surveillance
 that data privacy and the right of informational self-determination find a place in the Basic Constitutional Law in Germany and in European Law

Of course, this objectives can only be achieved by interested and committed people.

Supporters of Stop1984 

Supporter of Stop1984 are:
 Richard Stallman
 Brad Templeton
 Jacob Levich
 Wolf-Dieter Roth
 German Union for Privacy (http://www.datenschutzverein.de/ Website, German link)

Activities of Stop1984 

Every month Stop1984 published a magazine in German that could be downloaded, "Lasst mich in Ruhe" (Don't bother me).
The satirical story about the German state with the title "Henry läuft" (Henry runs) (archived version) was published there as well. Stop1984 also signed a statement (archived) of Privacy International.
Every day, Stop1984 sent a German summary of news regarding privacy, data privacy, press freedom and similar via email to its subscribers.

See also 

TCPA
Chaos Computer Club
ACLU

External links
217.172.182.26 - Reconstructed website of STOP1984 as of January 2007 by Corvus Corax (ex-webmaster)

Internet governance advocacy groups
Political organisations based in Germany